The 1997 Giro d'Italia was the 80th edition of the Giro d'Italia, one of cycling's Grand Tours. The field consisted of 180 riders, and 110 riders finished the race.

By rider

By nationality

References

1997 Giro d'Italia
1997